Babovo (Bulgarian: Бабово) is a village in northern Bulgaria. It is located in the municipality of Slivo Pole in Rousse.

As of March 2015 the village has a population of 422.

References

Villages in Ruse Province